Alf Boyack (5 September 1877 – 24 October 1947) was an Australian rules footballer who played for the Collingwood Football Club in the Victorian Football League (VFL).

Notes

External links 

		
Alf Boyack's profile at Collingwood Forever

1877 births
1947 deaths
Australian rules footballers from Victoria (Australia)
Collingwood Football Club players